The Research Organization for Energy and Manufacture (OREM) is one of Research Organizations under the umbrella of the National Research and Innovation Agency (BRIN). On 24 January 2022, the formation of the agency is announced and to be formed on 1 February 2022. The organization is resulted from restructuration of Assessment and Application of Technology Research Organization-BPPT (ORPPT-BPPT) and Engineering Science Research Organization (ORIPT). 

OREM is direct successor of Assessment and Application of Technology Research Organization-BPPT.

History 
After acquirement of Agency for the Assessment and Application of Technology (BPPT), BPPT transformed into ORPPT-BPPT under BRIN in September 2021. As it was from BPPT, ORPPT-BPPT was a big research organization with 16 research center and has very wide range of research focus.

On 24 January 2022, the ORPPT-BPPT is struck out and no longer listed in the BRIN Research Organizations list along with ORIPT, indicating that the organization is being phased out. Research centers under those two research organizations are being reorganized, resulted in formation of OREM itself, Nanotechnology and Material Research Organization (ORNM), and Electronics and Informatics Research Organization (OREI). 

OREM is formally established by Chairman of BRIN Decree No. 7/2022, backdated from 25 February 2022. OREM formation is finalized on 1 March 2022 and is functional since 4 March 2022 with inauguration of its first head, Haznan Abimanyu.

Structure 
The structure of OREM is as follows: 

 Office of the Head of OREM
 Research Center for Energy Conversion and Conservation  
 Research Center for Transportation Technology
 Research Center for Process and Manufacturing Industry Technology
 Research Center for Structural Strength Technology
 Research Center for Hydrodynamics Technology
 Research Center for Testing Technology and Standards
 Research Center for Sustainable Production System and Life Cycle Assessment 
 Research Groups

List of Heads

References 

Science and technology in Indonesia
Research institutes in Indonesia
2022 establishments in Indonesia
National Research and Innovation Agency